Towards a New Cold War: Essays on the Current Crisis and How We Got There is a 1982 book by Noam Chomsky.

References

External links
 Towards a New Cold War: Essays on the Current Crisis and How We Got There

Books about foreign relations of the United States
1982 non-fiction books
Books about the Cold War
Books by Noam Chomsky